Sir Denys Louis Lasdun, CH, CBE, RA (8 September 1914, Kensington, London – 11 January 2001, Fulham, London) was an eminent English architect, the son of Nathan Lasdun (1879–1920) and Julie (née Abrahams; 1884–1963). Probably his best known work is the Royal National Theatre, on London's South Bank of the Thames, which is a Grade II* listed building and one of the most notable examples of Brutalist design in the United Kingdom.

Lasdun studied at the Architectural Association School of Architecture in London, and was a junior in the practice of Wells Coates. Like other Modernist architects, including Sir Basil Spence and Peter and Alison Smithson, Lasdun was much influenced by Le Corbusier and Ludwig Mies van der Rohe, but there was a gentler, more classical influence, too, from the likes of Nicholas Hawksmoor. Lasdun was elected a Royal Academician on 29 May 1991.

Family
Lasdun's grandfather, the Australia-based tobacconist Louis Abrahams (1852–1903), was an important patron of Frederick McCubbin, Arthur Streeton and other artists associated with the Heidelberg School art movement, also known as Australian Impressionism. His art collection was passed down to Lasdun. His mother Julie Lasdun was a pianist who accompanied the Hungarian violinist Adila Fachiri. In 1930 she played in the first chamber performance of Constant Lambert's The Rio Grande, alongside Arthur Benjamin. The Royal College of Music commemorated her through the Julie Lasdun Prize.

Lasdun married Susan Bendit in 1954 and there were two sons and a daughter.  One is the author James Lasdun.

Early work

Before and after Second World War service in the army, Lasdun worked for a while with Berthold Lubetkin's Tecton practice, becoming a partner. During this period he also completed one private house in Paddington, in Le Corbusier's style. After the war, Lasdun worked with Lindsay Drake on the Hallfield Estate, which had been planned by Lubetkin and Tecton in a similar patterned, tightly planned idiom to his Spa Green and Priory Green Estates. Lasdun's Hallfield School was the first clue to his mature style, in its use of bare concrete and angularity, as well as its more human scale.

In the 1950s he was a partner with Jane Drew, Maxwell Fry and Lindsay Drake in Fry, Drew, Drake and Lasdun. His originality became more evident in his 'cluster blocks' in Bethnal Green. These were a response to the critique of much post-war development for creating an isolating environment and discouraging community. The cluster blocks grouped flats around a central tower, and tenants were intended to be able to pick out their own flats in the structure. The earlier blocks at Usk Street of 1954 were medium-sized, while the later block Keeling House is high-rise. Keeling House was sold to a private developer by the London Borough of Tower Hamlets, and is now a block of luxury flats. Lasdun made an excursion into private housing with his St James' Flats in 1958, the plan of which was partly derived from social housing models such as the Narkomfin Building.

Lasdun completed what may be regarded as his breakthrough masterwork in the Royal College of Physicians building in Regent's Park (1964). Inserted into a nationally important Nash set-piece terrace of neoclassical form, the RCP projects a raised linear form perpendicular to the terrace to create a series of gardens and spaces around the building, with annexes for lecture hall and an historic timber panelled room preserved from the earlier Colleges. Using modern reinforced concrete technology and highly expressive structural methods, the volumes are made to 'float in space' on the slimmest of supports to dissolve spatial boundaries between inside and out. The work makes implicit references to the work of the 'high modernists' from le Corbusier and Mies to the 'Scandinavian modernism' of Aalto, Asplund and Jacobsen as well as the contemporary Brutalist aesthetics of the era, yet developing a personal idiom of opened cantilevered volumes, long perspectives, triangulated form, and clarity of concept and structure that is entirely Lasdun's own. This building, however, is finished in luxurious white Sicilian marble, Murano glass mosaic tiles, polished brass and black engineering brick, and was one of the first post-War buildings to be awarded Grade I listing for national and international significance and influence on the work of others.

University buildings

Elements of Lasdun's most famous style, which combined cubic towers, bare concrete and jutting foyers, which was compared by some to Frank Lloyd Wright, can be found in his first educational buildings, the Fitzwilliam College, Cambridge and the Royal College of Physicians in Regent's Park, the latter of which compared favourably to the surrounding buildings by John Nash. More extensive was his design for the University of East Anglia. This consisted of a series of classrooms and laboratories connected by walkways, and glazed residential quarters shaped like ziggurats.  Following this acclaimed design Lasdun designed two buildings for the University of London, one for SOAS (1970) and another for the Institute of Education (1970–1976), which was particularly controversial in its insertion into the previous street plan of squares and terraces, which it tried to replicate in a more Brutalist manner. The expressed staircases make references to Wells Coates and Louis Kahn and Lasdun's masterplanning created a new public square. The building is now listed Grade II*.

Late work

The most famous and disputed of the architect's work is his Royal National Theatre on London's South Bank. Prince Charles compared it to a nuclear power station but it was popular with other traditionalists, with John Betjeman writing Lasdun a letter in praise of its design. Lasdun (or his firm Lasdun, Softley and Partners) designed the neighbouring IBM headquarters (finished 1985) as a continuity with the theatre. His European Investment Bank in Luxembourg was similar. The last work produced by the firm in London was an office block called Milton Gate near the Barbican Estate, which in its use of green-tinted glazing represented a departure from his familiar bare concrete style.

Lasdun was awarded the RIBA Royal Gold Medal in 1977. His drawings and papers are available for consultation at the RIBA Drawings & Archives Collections. Despite the controversy of much of his work, most of Lasdun's surviving buildings are listed, although his 1958 Peter Robinson department store on London's Strand was demolished in the 1990s.

Lasdun died on 11 January 2001 aged 86.

National Life Stories conducted an oral history interview (C467/9) with Denys Lasdun in 1996-97 for its Architects Lives' collection held by the British Library.

Projects

Hallfield Primary School, Paddington, London (1952), Grade II* listed
Keeling House (Grade II* listed: the first example of post-war council housing to gain this distinction) and Bradley House, Bethnal Green, east London (1957)
Peter Robinson department, Strand, London (1958) (demolished).
Castlemaine House, London, (1959–60)
26 St James's Place, London, (1959–60)
Fitzwilliam College, Cambridge (1959–63)
Royal College of Physicians, London (1960–64) Grade I listed
The core buildings of the University of East Anglia, Norwich (1962–68)
University Sports Centre, Oxford Road, Liverpool, England (1963)
The Charles Wilson building at the University of Leicester
The Lasdun Building, a residential block located in Stamford Hall, at the University of Leicester
Institute of Advanced Legal Studies, Institute of Education, and the library of the School of Oriental and African Studies, Bloomsbury
New Court, Christ's College, Cambridge (1966–70)
Royal National Theatre, South Bank, London (1967–76) Grade II* listed
The first phase of the European Investment Bank, Luxembourg (1974–80)
IBM Building, South Bank, London (1979–83)

References

The Legacy of Lasdun
 Oxford Dictionary of National Biography
 William J. R. Curtis, Denys Lasdun: Architecture, City, Landscape (Phaidon, 1994)
 Barnabas Calder, "The Education of an Architect: Denys Lasdun in the 1930s" in British Modern (2007)
Inspiring physicians biography

1914 births
2001 deaths
Architects from London
English Jews
Jewish architects
Modernist architects from England
Brutalist architects
People associated with the University of East Anglia
People associated with the UCL Institute of Education
People associated with SOAS University of London
Members of the Order of the Companions of Honour
People associated with the University of Leicester
Recipients of the Royal Gold Medal
Wolf Prize in Arts laureates
Alumni of the Architectural Association School of Architecture
Commanders of the Order of the British Empire
Knights Bachelor
Royal Academicians